Abrar Al-Fahad (born 3 August 1984) is a Kuwaiti taekwondo practitioner.

References

Asian Games medalists in taekwondo
Taekwondo practitioners at the 2006 Asian Games
Taekwondo practitioners at the 2014 Asian Games
1984 births
Asian Games bronze medalists for Kuwait
Living people
Medalists at the 2014 Asian Games